The next local elections in Turkey are scheduled for 2024.

References

See also 

Local elections in Turkey
Future elections in Turkey